{{Chembox
| Verifiedfields = changed
| Watchedfields = changed
| verifiedrevid = 477238617
| ImageFile = Acetamiprid Structural Formulae V.1.svg
| ImageSize = 250px
| ImageFile1 = Acetamiprid 3D ball.png
| ImageSize1 = 240
| ImageAlt1 = Ball-and-stick model of the acetamiprid molecule
|IUPACName=N-[(6-chloro-3-pyridyl)methyl]-N'''-cyano-N-methyl-acetamidine 
|OtherNames= (1E)-N-[(6-Chlor-3-pyridinyl)methyl]-N-cyan-N-methylethanimidamid;
|Section1= 
|Section2= 
|Section3= 
}}Acetamiprid' is an organic compound with the chemical formula C10H11ClN4. It is an odorless neonicotinoid insecticide produced under the trade names Assail, and Chipco by Aventis CropSciences. It is systemic and intended to control sucking insects (Thysanoptera, Hemiptera, mainly aphids) on crops such as leafy vegetables, citrus fruits, pome fruits, grapes, cotton, cole crops, and ornamental plants. It is also a key pesticide in commercial cherry farming due to its effectiveness against the larvae of the cherry fruit fly.

Acetamiprid is an insecticide belonging to the chloropyridinyl neonicotinoids, this family of insecticides was introduced in the early 1990s. This compound is an insecticide that is introduced for controlling pests, but also for domestic use to control fleas on cats and dogs.

 Structure and reactivity 
Acetamiprid is an α-chloro-N-heteroaromatic compound. It is a neonicotinoid with a chloropyridinyl group and it is comparable to other neonicotinoids such as imidacloprid, nitenpyram and thiacloprid. These substances all have a 6-chloro-3-pyridine methyl group but differ in the nitroguanidine, nitromethylene, or cyanoamidine substituent on an acyclic or cyclic moiety.

There are two isomeric forms in acetamiprid with E and Z-configurations of the cyanoimino group. There are also a variety of stable conformers due to the rotation of single bonds in the N-pyridylmethylamino group. The E-conformer is more stable than the Z-conformer and assumed to be the active form. In solution, two different E-conformers exist which slowly change into each other.

 Mechanism of action 
Acetamiprid is a nicotine-like substance and reacts to the body in a similar way as nicotine. Nicotine is a natural insecticide of which many man-made insecticides are derivatives. Acetamiprid is a nicotinic agonist that reacts with nicotinic acetylcholine receptors (nACh-R). These receptors are located in the post-synaptic dendrites of all neurons in the brain, spinal cord, ganglia and muscular junctions. The activation of the nACh-R receptors causes hyperactivity and muscle spasms, and eventually death. Acetamiprid is highly toxic to insects, but less to mammals.

 Metabolism 
The metabolism of acetamiprid has been primarily studied in plants and soil. However, a recent study (2005) focussed on the metabolism of acetamiprid in honey bees. The honey bees in this study were fed a sucrose solution that contained acetamiprid. Seven different metabolites were discovered, of which two could not be identified. The five most abundant of these metabolites were found in the abdomen of the bee. Within the first hour of ingestion, acetamiprid concentrations were highest in tissues with a high nicotinic acetylcholine receptor density such as the abdomen, thorax and head.

Acetamiprid was rapidly distributed throughout the bee's body, but also rapidly metabolised into the seven compounds. The substance is not just broken down in the gut, but in the entire body of the bee. This is mainly done by Type I enzymes such as mixed function oxidases. These enzymes use O2 to catalyze a reaction and convert acetamiprid into more polar metabolites. This makes it easier to excrete the compounds because the compounds become more hydrophilic. Phase I enzymes form the first step in metabolizing the compound. Phase I metabolites can be bioactive.

Three metabolic pathways exist, based on the kinetics of the metabolites that were found. The first pathway starts with the oxidative cleavage of the nitromethylene bond of acetamiprid. This is followed by another oxidation that forms 6-chloronicotinic acid. 6-Chloronicotinic acid is then transformed in one of the unidentified compounds, with an increased polarity. The second possible pathway is based on N-demethylation reactions, followed by oxidation of the nitromethylene bond of the intermediates. This will also result in 6-chloronicotinic acid.

The last pathway consists of the oxidative cleavage of the cyanamine group. In this reaction a 1-3 ketone derivative is formed. This compound will undergo N-deacetylation which forms a 1-4 ketone derivative. This compound is transformed by oxidative cleavage into 6-chloropicolyl alcohol. From here, the compound can be metabolized in two different ways: either it is oxidized into 6-chloronicotinic acid or it is converted into a glycoconjugate derivative. The latter is probably in favour of the oxidization.

 Efficacy and side effects 
 Efficacy 
Acetamiprid is used to protect a variety of crops, plants and flowers. It can be used combined with another pesticide with a different mode of action. This way the developing of resistance by pest species can be prevented. According to the US EPA acetamiprid could play a role in battling resistance in the species: Bemisia, greenhouse whiteflies and western flower thrips.

Neonicotinoids act as agonists for nAChR and are selectively toxic to insects versus mammals, because of a higher potency on insect than mammalian nAChRs. This increases their suitability as pesticides.

 Adverse effects 
Acetamiprid has a high potential for bioaccumulation and is highly toxic to birds and moderately toxic to aquatic organisms. Excessive use of the pesticide could pose a threat to bird populations and other parts of the food chain. On the other hand, the metabolites that are produced after the absorption of acetamiprid in the honey bee are less toxic than those of other neonicotinoides. The half-life time of acetamiprid is also rather short, approximately 25–30 minutes, whereas other neonicotinoides can have a half-life of 4–5 hours. However, some metabolites are still present in the honey bee after 72 hours. This might be a toxicological risk for honey bees, as chronic exposure can increase the toxicity of certain compounds. The EPA considers it "only moderately toxic" to bees; however, some media sources and the recent documentary Vanishing of the Bees'' have blamed neonicotinoids like acetamiprid for colony collapse disorder.

According to a report of the EPA from 2002, acetamiprid poses low risks to the environment compared to other insecticides. It degrades rapidly in soil and has therefore a low chance of leaching into groundwater. The degradation products will be able to reach the groundwater but are predicted to not be of toxicological significance.

Toxicity

Insect studies 
Extensive studies in the honeybee showed that acetamiprid LD50 is 7.1 µg with a 95% confidence interval of 4.57-11.2 µg/bee. In comparison, the LD50 of imidacloprid is 17,9 ng per bee. The difference in these comparable substances may be explained by a slightly weaker affinity of acetamiprid for nAChr when compared with imidacloprid.

Neonicotinoids with a nitroguanidine group, such as imidacloprid, are most toxic to honey bees. Acetamiprid has an acyclic group instead of a second heterocyclic ring and is therefore much less toxic to honey bees than nitro-substituted compounds.

Humans 
As of now, two human case-studies have been described with acute poisoning by ingestion of an insecticide mixture containing acetamiprid whilst trying to commit suicide. Both patients were transported to an emergency room within two hours, and were instantly experiencing nausea, muscle weakness, convulsions and low body temperature (33.7 °C and 34.3 °C respectively). Symptoms such as muscle weakness seem to be similar to organophosphate insecticide exposure. Hypothermia and convulsions can be directly explained by the active acetamiprid compound which react with acetylcholine- and nicotinic receptors. Although mammalian toxicity is recorded as low, high doses of acetamiprid are recorded to be toxic to humans.

Safety indications 
Acetamiprid is classified as unlikely to be a human carcinogen. Acetamiprid has a low acute and chronic toxicity in mammals with no evidence of carcinogenicity, neurotoxicity or mutagenicity. It is classified as toxicity category rating II in acute oral studies with rats, toxicity category III in acute dermal and inhalation studies with rats, and toxicity category IV in primary eye and skin irritation studies with rabbits. It is mobile in soil, but degrades rapidly via aerobic soil metabolism, with studies showing its half-life between <1 and 8.2 days. The U.S. Environmental Protection Agency (EPA) does not consider it to be environmentally persistent.

A recent study has implicated acetamiprid as a cause of erectile dysfunction in human males and may be implicated in the problem of declining human fertility, and called into question its safety, particularly where its use may be subject to abuse.

In China, the maximum dose is lower than in the US. The recommended dose that is used in agriculture ranges from 0.055 to 0.17 pounds of active ingredient per acre.

References

External links 
 PEA Fact sheet
 

Amidines
Chloropyridines
Nitriles
Neonicotinoids